Alexander A. Madiebo (29 April 1932 – 3 June 2022) was a Nigerian soldier. He served as the General Officer Commanding (GOC) of the Republic of Biafra which existed from 1967 to 1970.

Life and career 
Madiebo joined the military in 1954, during the colonial era, after graduating from Government College, Umuahia. In 1960, he was deployed to Congo, during the Congo Crisis as a peacekeeping force for United Nations Operation in the Congo. In 1964, he was made the first indigenous commander of the Artillery Regiment. He fled from the northern region during the 1966 anti-Igbo pogrom. He was the General Officer Commanding of the Republic of Biafra during the Nigerian Civil War. He joined Ojukwu to flee to Ivory Coast. He died on 3 June 2022 at the age of 90.

References 

1932 births
2022 deaths
Igbo Army personnel
Government College Umuahia alumni
Biafran Armed Forces personnel
Nigerian Army officers